Treschow is a family originating in Denmark and with branches in Norway and Sweden. The family name means "wooden shoe-maker" and the family later counted many merchants in the 17th century and priests in the 18th century. A member of the family, Michael Treschow, bought the status of untitled (lower) nobility in Denmark in 1812, although Norway, where he was resident, abolished the concept of nobility only a few years later. Members of this family have been industrialists and landowners, notably in Vestfold.

General history

Origin
The family may be followed back to Niels Hansen († 1593), who lived in Næstved, Denmark. His son was Rasmus Nielsen Træskomager († 1633). He and many of his descendants were merchants. His son Giort Rasmussen Treschow (ca. 1623–1665) was a shipowner and a merchant.
The family came to Norway with Giort Treschow's sons Gerhard Treschow (ca. 1659–1719), an industrialist who ran a shipping company, a sawmill and a papermill in Oslo, and Herman Treschow (1665–1723), who was his brother's general manager in Trondheim. Herman Treschow was the grandfather of Michael Treschow (1741–1816), who was district governor in Roskilde.

1812 ennoblement
Michael Treschow, son of parish priest Herman Treschow in Søllerød, Denmark, was in 1812 ennobled by letters patent, thus becoming part of the untitled nobility. By the provisions of the patent, the patrilineal descendants of Michael Treschow, including unmarried females, were considered noble. However, as most of the family members were Norwegian subjects, persons born after the 1821 Nobility Law were not considered as noble in Norway. The family's most prominent living member, Mille-Marie Treschow, would have forfeited her noble status by marrying a commoner if official nobility still had existed. Also her children bear the surname Treschow, but would not have been considered as noble according to the letters patent, as noble status is inherited only patrilineally. The agnatic descendants of Michael Treschow are nevertheless included in the Yearbook of the Danish Nobility (Danmarks Adels Aarbog) which is published by a private organisation.

Fritzøe line
Willum Frederik Treschow (1786–1869) had the son Michael Treschow (1814–1901) til Fritzøe. He was the father of Norwegian chamberlain (kammerherre) and lord chamberlain ( hofchef) Frederik "Fritz" Wilhelm Treschow til Fritzøe (1841–1903) as well as Swedish chamberlain Peter Oluf Brøndsted Treschow (1843–1881) and Michael Aagaard Treschow (1848–1919) who owned the Swedish estate Sannarps herrgård in the parish of Årstads in Falkenberg Municipality. 

The latter founded a Swedish branch of the family and was the father of the Danish envoie Peter Oluf Treschow (1890–1970) and Niels Treschow of Hjuleberg and Sannarp (1881–1953). Niels Treschow was the father of Gert Treschow (born 1913), a major in the Royal Swedish Army, who was the father of Marianne Treschow (born 1941) and Niels Michael Aage Treschow (born 1943). Peter Oluf Brøndsted Treschow was the father of Fritz Michael Treschow of Fritzøe (1879–1971), father of Gerhard Aage Treschow of Fritzøe (1923–2001), who was the father of Mille-Marie Treschow  (1954-2018).

Coats of arms

Family members previously used various arms, including one with a clog, referring to the occupation of their ancestor (Nissen and Aaase, p. 143).

In the 19th century, Michael Treschow for himself and his descendants adopted a coat of arms which is nearly identical to that of the German Uradel family of Tresckow. The Norwegian Træskomager/Treschow family is unrelated to the noble German family, and the name has a completely different etymology. Some other Norwegian families are known to have adopted coats of arms (or variations thereof) of unrelated families with similar names.

Description: On silver background three (two over one) black jackdaw heads with a golden collar each. On the helm a noble coronet. Above the coronet a black jackdaw head with a golden collar, and on the top three peacock feathers.

The new coat of arms includes the motto Pie Candide Constanter.

Prominent Members
 Marie Treschow (1913–1952), Norwegian philanthropist
 Michael Treschow (1741–1816), progenitor
 Frederik Treschow (1786–1869), supreme court attorney, politician, landowner and philanthropist 
 Michael Treschow (born 1943), Swedish businessman
 Mille-Marie Treschow  (1954-2018), owner of the Norwegian consortium Treschow-Fritzøe
 Frederik Conrad Bugge Treschow (31 December 1822 - 22 August 1893), publisher

References

Other Sources

 Dansk biografisk lexikon: Treschow
 Dansk biografisk lexikon: Gerhard Treschow
 Dansk biografisk lexikon: Michael Treschow

Danish families
Danish noble families
Norwegian families
Norwegian noble families
Patriciate of Norway
Norwegian-language surnames
1912 establishments in Denmark